Tippecanoe Mall is an enclosed shopping mall in Lafayette, Indiana. Opened in 1974, it is anchored by JCPenney, Macy's,  Kohl's, and Dick's Sporting Goods. It is owned by Simon Property Group.

History
Melvin Simon & Associates opened Tippecanoe Mall in 1974. It was originally slated for a 1973 opening with Montgomery Ward and Detroit-based Federal's as its anchors, although the other anchor instead became JCPenney. William H. Block Co. was added as a third anchor.

Montgomery Ward closed its store at the mall in April 1983. The same year, high winds damaged the Block store, so Block temporarily moved its merchandise to the former Montgomery Ward while its store was repaired. By 1985, Kohl's had replaced the Montgomery Ward. Block's became Lazarus in 1987. An expansion announced in 1994 added a new wing anchored by Sears and L. S. Ayres, the latter of which relocated from Market Square Mall.

The first Hat World opened at Tippecanoe Mall in 1995. Lazarus closed its store and two others in 2002. In 2004, the Lazarus building was razed for Dick's Sporting Goods and hhgregg. L. S. Ayres became Macy's in 2006. H&M opened in 2012, replacing a former MC Sports. Hhgregg closed in 2017 as a result of Chapter 11 Bankruptcy. For the Halloween season, Spirit Halloween took over the former hhgregg spot temporarily.

On May 31, 2018, it was announced that Sears would be closing as part of a plan to close 72 stores nationwide. The store closed on September 2, 2018.

References

External links
Tippecanoe Mall

Simon Property Group
Shopping malls established in 1974
Shopping malls in Indiana
Buildings and structures in Lafayette, Indiana
Tourist attractions in Tippecanoe County, Indiana